In Iran, like many other developed countries, Smart Grid implementation is regarded as a unique way for encountering many serious environmental and economic challenges that mankind is faced today. FAHAM is the National Smart Metering Program in Iran. The functional, technical, security, economic, and general requirements of this project was published as a document after a longtime workgroup of various stakeholders including representative of grid operators, meter manufactures, communication providers, business layer software providers, domestic and international consultants. The procedure of producing this document was base on EPRI Methodology (IEC 62559). In these technical documents all of the business and functional use cases, the conceptual architecture, mandatory international standards for electric, water and gas metering systems(for all types of consumers),telecommunication requirements, system interfaces and security mandates are defined. The ministry of energy decided to perform a pilot project called FAHAM-phase1, in order to experiment the execution and technical challenges for implementing Smart Metering for all of the consumers (about thirty million consumers).

History

In January 2010, The Iranian parliament regulated that Tavanir and Grid operators shall decrease electricity grid loss at least 1% per year with 14% overall network loss in 2015. This important decision has been also stated in clause 47 of the "targeted subsidy law."
In March 2009, Tavanir assigned IEEO as Iranian AMI project manager. In April 2010, government decided to support finance of national smart metering roll-out to facilitate power network technical and non technical loss decreasing as well as demand management. 
Deploying an AMI is an essential early step to grid modernization. AMI is not a single technology but it is an integration of many technologies such as smart meter, communication network and management system that provides an intelligent connection between consumers and system operators. AMI gives system operator and consumers the information they need to make smart decisions, and also the ability to execute those decisions that they are not currently able to do.
IEEO is responsible for implementation and deployment of Smart Metering project (that is called FAHAM) in Iran. The IEEO follows promoting energy efficiency and load management, improve system reliability, and reduce operational costs by implementing smart metering project.

Awards
FAHAM, The national smart metering Program in IRAN, was candidate for the Green Project Award and received the green management certificate of European association of green management in 2014

Functionality of FAHAM

FAHAM was candidate for the Green Project Award and received the green management certificate of European association of green management in 2014
The target of FAHAM is decreasing electricity loss at least 1% per year and 14% decrease in overall network loss by 2015. FAHAM transforms the meter from a simple measuring and counting device, to one element of an integrated system of hardware, software and people that can be used to better manage the electric service which customers find essential to their lives. 
FAHAM is not simply a tool to capture customer consumption of energy, but hardware and software architecture capable of capturing real-time consumption, demand, voltage, current and other information.
Data can be provided at the customer level and for other enterprise level systems either on a scheduled basis or on demand. FAHAM will communicate this data to a central location, sorting and analyzing it for a variety of purposes such as customer billing, outage response, system loading conditions and demand side management. FAHAM as a two-way communication network, will also send this information to other systems, customers and third parties, as well as send information back through the network and meters to capture additional data, control equipment and update the configuration and software of equipments.

FAHAM has some social and environmental major benefits for distribution system, customers and external parties, including below items:

Social benefits
 No need for periodic trips to each physical location to read the meters
 Establishment of appropriate services for developing the electronic government
 Increasing electricity sale options with different prices
 Power delivery with higher quality and reliability
 Reducing cost of electricity due to reduced operating costs
 Increasing billing accuracy and speed by eliminating the human error factor
 Providing better customer service
 Creating customer's participation in consumption management and costs reduction

Environmental benefits
 Reducing polluted gas and  emissions
 Reducing consumption through network energy management and reducing network losses
 Demand management through sharing the information with customers

Economical benefits
 Reducing non-technical losses
 Demand management (tariff management)
 Improving consumption patterns through the information shared with the customer
 Improving the payment system
 Reducing total costs of meter's reading, operation and maintenance, and customer's disconnection and reconnection
 Preparation for electricity retail markets

See also

smart meters
smart grid

References

External links
Iran’s smart grid deployment – from smart meter to overall system architecture
Feasibility and Cost/Benefit Analysis of Implementing Electric Vehicle in Iran Smart Distribution System
Smart metering project(Faham) has been started in Iran
Iran’s smart grid deployment – from smart meter to overall system architecture
National Smart Metering Program in IRAN (Report)
Technical Feature of FAHAM
saba.org.ir/en
deputy of metering & smart grid of IEEO
FAHAM- Advanced Metering Infrastructure - YouTube
NARI Group Contracted for Iran National Smart Metering Project

2010 establishments in Iran
Electric power in Iran
Smart grid